The SLIAC men's basketball tournament is the annual conference basketball championship tournament for the NCAA Division III St. Louis Intercollegiate Athletic Conference. The tournament has been held annually since the SLIAC started play in 1991, with a five-year hiatus between 2000 and 2004. It is a single-elimination tournament and seeding is based on regular season records.

The winner, declared conference champion, receives the SLIAC's automatic bid to the NCAA Men's Division III Basketball Championship.

Results

Championship records

 Schools highlighted in pink are former members of the SLIAC
 Mississippi Women and Principia have not yet qualified for the tournament finals
 Iowa Wesleyan, Parks, and Lincoln Christian never qualified for the tournament finals as conference members

References

NCAA Division III men's basketball conference tournaments
Basketball Tournament, Men's
Recurring sporting events established in 1991